Paul Atkinson Jr. (born March 27, 1999) is an American professional basketball player for Atomerőmű SE of the Nemzeti Bajnokság I/A. He played college basketball player for the Notre Dame Fighting Irish and the Yale Bulldogs.

Early life and high school career
Atkinson grew up in West Palm Beach, Florida and attended the Westminster Academy in Fort Lauderdale, Florida. As a junior, he led Westminster Academy to the Class 3A state championship game, where they fell to Windermere Prep. Atkinson committed to play college basketball at Yale at the beginning of his senior year after receiving interest from Dayton, UNC-Wilmington, and Richmond. As a senior, Atkinson averaged 20.6 points, 13.1 rebounds and 3.1 assists per game and was the Sun-Sentinel South Florida Player of the Year. He had 17 points and 12 rebounds in the 3A championship game.

College career
Atkinson was a starter for Yale as a true freshman and averaged 9.3 points and 4.6 rebounds per game. Atkinson was forced to play major minutes due to an injury to Jordan Bruner, and Yale coach James Jones praised Atkinson for his shot selection and accuracy, but wanted more aggressiveness from him. He mostly came off the bench as a sophomore and averaged 9.1 points and 5.0 rebounds per game. Prior to his junior season, Atkinson gained 20 pounds and worked on his athleticism. As a junior, Akinson was named the Ivy League Co-Player of the Year alongside Penn's A. J. Brodeur after averaging 17.6 points and 7.3 rebounds per game and leading the Ivy League with .630 field goal percentage during the regular season. Following the season, Atkinson declared for the 2020 NBA draft. 

Atkinson entered the transfer portal after the 2020–2021 Ivy League season was canceled due to the COVID-19 pandemic. He chose to transfer to Notre Dame as a graduate transfer after considering offers from Miami (Florida), Iowa, NC State and Texas. Atkinson was named Honorable Mention All-ACC. He averaged 12.6 points, 6.9 rebounds, and 1.6 assists per game.

Professional career
On July 10, 2022, Atkinson signed with Atomerőmű SE of the Nemzeti Bajnokság I/A.

Career statistics

College

|-
| style="text-align:left;"| 2017–18
| style="text-align:left;"| Yale
| 31 || 30 || 24.2 || .692 || – || .667 || 4.6 || 1.0 || .7 || .5 || 9.3
|-
| style="text-align:left;"| 2018–19
| style="text-align:left;"| Yale
| 30 || 1 || 20.2 || .697 || .000 || .653 || 5.0 || 1.0 || .5 || .6 || 9.1
|-
| style="text-align:left;"| 2019–20
| style="text-align:left;"| Yale
| 30 || 29 || 31.8 || .630 || .308 || .671 || 7.3 || 1.5 || 1.2 || .8 || 17.6
|- class="sortbottom"
| style="text-align:center;" colspan="2"| Career
| 91 || 60 || 25.4 || .661 || .286 || .665 || 5.6 || 1.2 || .8 || .6 || 12.0

Personal life
Atkinson's parents, Paul and Laura, met in Stamford, Connecticut, in high school. They moved to Georgia, where Paul Jr. was born, before returning to Stamford and finally moving to West Palm Beach.

References

External links
Notre Dame Fighting Irish bio
Yale Bulldogs bio
ReaglGM profile

1999 births
Living people
American men's basketball players
American expatriate basketball people in Hungary
Basketball players from Florida
Notre Dame Fighting Irish men's basketball players
Power forwards (basketball)
Sportspeople from West Palm Beach, Florida
Yale Bulldogs men's basketball players